The 2007 Australian motorcycle Grand Prix was the sixteenth round of the 2007 MotoGP championship. It was held over the weekend of 12–14 October 2007 at the Phillip Island Grand Prix Circuit, Philip Island, Victoria.

MotoGP race report
This race was most notable for Casey Stoner's first victory in front of his home crowd, two weeks after the Australian became Ducati's first ever world champion at the previous round in Japan. The team also won the constructors championship, the first time a European manufacturer has done this since 1973.

Dani Pedrosa took pole position on Saturday, followed by Valentino Rossi and Casey Stoner. Nicky Hayden took the first spot on the second row in fourth, Loris Capirossi was fifth and Randy de Puniet in sixth.

All riders take off and do their usual warm-up lap before lining up in their respective grid slots. As the lights went out, Stoner immediately went into the lead on the opening lap going into the Doohan corner. Hayden also managed to pass both Rossi and Pedrosa for second, with Pedrosa and Rossi losing two places (first to third, second to fourth). Capirossi did not make up any positions and was still in fifth place. Stoner and Hayden open up a small gap to Pedrosa and Rossi during the lap.

As lap two begins, Marco Melandri makes a move on the Pramac Ducati of Alex Barros for sixth, overtaking him on the start/finish straight. Rossi then makes a move on Pedrosa for third spot, overtaking him at the Honda Corner as he does not want the two at the front to ride away. However, coming out of the fast, unnamed Turn 12 corner, Rossi went slightly wide and onto the grass, undoing all his hard work and dropping him back to fourth behind Pedrosa.

Lap three and Rossi now needs to make up the lost ground to Pedrosa again. Stoner and Hayden are opening up a gap at the front, with Pedrosa still in third. Capirossi meanwhile is slowly closing in on the two, with Hayden shadowing Stoner all throughout the lap, as does Rossi. Melandri overtakes Capirossi for fifth place at the fast, unnamed Turn 8 right hander. Rossi's rear tyre smokes as he tries to get a better exit out of Turn 12, with Stoner almost going onto the grass as he uses the full kerb for maximum acceleration coming out of Turn 12.

On lap four, Hayden is still trying to get past Stoner but he refuses him the opportunity in the first two corners. Rossi meanwhile finally manages to overtake Pedrosa at the Southern Loop by going through on the inside with a tighter line. Pedrosa tries to get back at him by lining up a pass at the Honda Corner, but fails to brake in time, runs in too deep and loses fourth to Melandri instead. Rossi then tries to close in on the top two.

Lap five and Pedrosa retakes fourth by overtaking Melandri on the start/finish straight, going into Doohan Corner. Melandri takes the position back by outbraking Pedrosa at the Honda corner and at the front, Stoner is slowly opening up a gap to Hayden.

On lap six, Pedrosa overtakes Melandri once more for fourth down at the start/finish straight, with Melandri trying replicate his overtaking manoeuver at the Honda Corner. This time however, he fails as he goes too wide, allowing Pedrosa to keep the place. Rossi also set a fastest lap so far.

As lap seven gets underway, Hayden's gap to Stoner is increasing, with Rossi slowly reeling in Hayden in return. No overtakes happen at the front.

Lap eight and Stoner has a big moment exiting the Southern Loop, but he does not lose any time because of it. Still no overtakes at the front.

On lap nine, Nicky Hayden suddenly started to lose ground to Stoner halfway around the lap. Exiting Turn 12, Rossi had almost wholly caught him entering the start/finish straight.

Lap ten and Rossi overtakes an ever fading Hayden into the Doohan Corner, moving him up to second.

On lap eleven, Rossi starts to pull away from Hayden. Pedrosa meanwhile was closing in on Hayden, cutting −0.813 seconds off of the gap.

Lap twelve and Pedrosa has now caught Hayden. Just before Lukey Heights, his bike suddenly slows – a result of motor problems. He sticks out his leg to warn others but almost hits Pedrosa in the process. Furiously, he hits the front of his bike, then rides off into te gravel to retire.

As lap thirteen begins, Hayden is still angry as he walks off of the gravel trap. Hayden's retirement moves Pedrosa up to third, Melandri to fourth, Capirossi to fifth and Barros to sixth place. Stoner has created a gap that's over 4 seconds to Rossi as well. Further back, Capirossi's Bridgestone-shod Ducati had caught Melandri at a rapid pace.

On lap fourteen, Melandri's Bridgestone-shod Gresini Honda of started to close the gap slightly to Pedrosa's Michelin-shod Repsol Honda, with Capirossi doing likewise to Melandri. Stoner extended his lead to around +4.7 seconds over Rossi at the front.

Lap fifteen and Melandri is now all over the back of Pedrosa. Melandri wanted to overtake him going up the hill at Lukey Heights, but made a mistake and ran wide, almost gifting Capirossi fourth position.

On lap sixteen, Capirossi was harassing Melandri for the fourth spot. Chaz Davies meanwhile had reached the pits after retiring a few laps earlier. Rossi now started to lose ground to Pedrosa as well, the Spaniard catching up to the Italian's rear wheel.

Going into lap seventeen, Capirossi made his move at the start/finish straight. Using the superior top speed of his Ducati, he goes side by side and outbreaks Melandri going into Doohan Corner for third place. Pedrosa meanwhile went side by side on the outside with Rossi into said corner and overtook him at the next one – the Southern Loop – to take second from him. He then had a major wobble with his front wheel before going into the Stoner Corner, but lost no ground to anyone.

Lap eighteen and Stoner's lead over Pedrosa is +6.716 seconds. Rossi refuses to let him run away with second and hangs on and Capirossi is slowly catching up with the two. Pedrosa then went wide at the Honda Corner, almost allowing Rossi to pass him. Rossi then harasses Pedrosa for the remainder of the lap.

As lap nineteen begins, Capirossi once again uses his Ducati's superior top speed to blast past the Yamaha of Rossi and moves up into third position before the Doohan Corner. He then surprises Pedrosa by moving up his inside at the Southern Loop to take two positions in two corners – making full use of his superior Bridgestone tyres – and make it a Ducati 1–2, much to the delight of the Ducati pit box. Pedrosa – now suffering badly with the tyres – is also overtaken by Rossi at the Honda Corner to take the bottom step of the podium.

Lap twenty and there's only seven laps to go. Stoner is still comfortably ahead with a +7.420 lead over Capirossi. Rossi meanwhile almost gets overtaken by Pedrosa at the start/finish straight, but he denies Pedrosa going into the Doohan Corner. Further back, Melandri – who has been suffering with his tyres since his mistake – has been caught by the Pramac Ducati of Barros, and gets passed by him at Turn 11.

On lap twenty-one, no overtakes happened at the front, though Rossi was still trying to find a way past Capirossi.

Lap twenty-two and the midfield runners Chris Vermeulen and Anthony West battle for ninth position. West passes Vermeulen going into the Doohan Corner. Behind them are also Colin Edwards and Carlos Checa, fighting for tenth place.

Lap twenty-three and Capirossi now starts to open up a gap to Rossi. No overtakes happened at the front.

On lap twenty-four, no overtakes happened.

Lap twentyfive – the penultimate lap – and Stoner has lost some margin, shrinking his gap to +6.869 seconds to Capirossi, who himself has now pulled a +1.783 second gap back to Rossi down in third position. Rossi himself has also pulled a significant gap of +1.679 seconds back to Pedrosa.

The final lap – lap twentysix – has begun and the top four is as follows: Stoner, Capirossi, Rossi and Pedrosa. Further back, Kawasaki rider Randy de Puniet and Suzuki rider John Hopkins had passed Melandri for sixth and seventh place. Vermeulen also passed Melandri for eighth not much later. Stoner had no problems on this lap and crossed it to win his ninth race of the season. Capirossi and Rossi crossed the line in second and third, Pedrosa in fourth and Barros fifth – his third highest position of the season. De Puniet and Hopkins finished sixth and seventh and Vermeulen and Edwards eighth and ninth.

On the parade lap back to parc-fermé, Stoner valiantly waves the Australian flag, with Capirossi doing likewise with a small Italian flag. The jubilant Australian and Stoner fans enjoy the scene on the tribunes, clapping and waving Australian and 27 (Stoner's number) flags of their own. Hopkins congratulates him via a handshake whilst still being on his bike, with Vermeulen congratulating him also.

Rossi arrives to parc fermé and hugs one of his crewmembers. Stoner also arrives and talks to his delighted crewmembers, as does a visibly tired Capirossi. The Ducati teammates hug each other as well. The three then talk to the press before the podium ceremony.

The riders walk up to the podium, with Rossi the first to emerge, followed by Capirossi and Stoner. They take their places on their respective podium slots and the important figures hand out the trophies to the third, second and first place riders. The Australian national anthem plays for Stoner and the trio sprays the champagne.

MotoGP classification

250 cc classification

125 cc classification

Championship standings after the race (MotoGP)

Below are the standings for the top five riders and constructors after round sixteen has concluded.

Riders' Championship standings

Constructors' Championship standings

 Note: Only the top five positions are included for both sets of standings.

References

Australian motorcycle Grand Prix
Australian
Motorcycle
Motorsport at Phillip Island